The 1990 WTA Tour (officially titled 1990 Kraft General Foods World Tour after its sponsor) was the elite professional tennis circuit organized by the Women's Tennis Association (WTA) for the 1990 tennis season. The 1990 WTA Tour calendar comprised the four Grand Slam tournaments, the WTA Tour Championships and the WTA Tier I, Tier II, Tier III, Tier IV and Tier V events. ITF tournaments were not part of the WTA Tour, although they award points for the WTA World Ranking.

Schedule
The complete schedule of events on the 1990 calendar, with player progression documented from the quarterfinals stage.

Key

December 1989

January

February

March

April

May

June

July

August

September

October

November

Rankings
Below are the 1990 WTA year-end rankings (November 26, 1990) in both singles and doubles competition:

* West Germany (FRG) prior to 3 October 1990.

See also
 1990 ATP Tour

References

 
WTA Tour
WTA Tour seasons